Batchawana Water Aerodrome  was located in Batchawana Bay,  south of Batchawana Bay, Ontario, Canada.

References

Defunct seaplane bases in Ontario